The fourth Nations Cup tournament was played at the University of Northern Colorado, USA during July and August 2013 following on from the Under-20s competition which took place at Trent College, Long Eaton, England in early July. The tournaments included teams from the United States, South Africa, England and Canada.

This tournament was succeeded by the Women's Rugby Super Series.

Nations Cup 2013 (University of Northern Colorado)

Final table

Points scoring 
4 points awarded for a win, 2 points for a draw, no points for a loss. 1 bonus point awarded for scoring four or more tries and 1 bonus point for losing by less than 7 points.

Results

Third place

Final

Under 20 Nations Cup 2013 (Trent College, Long Eaton)

Final table

Results

Third place

Final

See also
Women's international rugby

2013
International women's rugby union competitions hosted by England
International women's rugby union competitions hosted by the United States
2013 rugby union tournaments for national teams
2013 in women's rugby union
2013 in Canadian rugby union
2013 in American rugby union
2013 in South African rugby union
2013–14 in English rugby union
rugby union
rugby union
rugby union